Paul Hedqvist (21 July 1895 Stockholm - 23 June 1977) was a Swedish modernist architect with many official commissions in Sweden through the 1930s, including housing projects, major bridges, many schools, and urban planning work.  His practice evolved into designing office towers and at least one major stadium in the postwar 1950s.  At one point he served as the city architect of Stockholm.

Biography
Hedqvist studied at the KTH Royal Institute of Technology in Stockholm and worked for Ragnar Östberg before opening his own office in 1924, with his partner David Dahl.  Hedqvist became part of the functionalist movement developing in Sweden after Stockholm International Exhibition (1930), which he took part in.  Through the war, from 1938 through 1948, he was professor at the Royal Swedish Academy of Fine Arts in Stockholm.

Hedqvist worked as a functionalist.  Early in his career he took part in the 1930 Stockholm Housing Exhibition, organized by Gregor Paulsson, but Hedqvist chose not to join other Swedish architects in the "Accept!" movement.  Instead he was awarded a good share of Sweden's high-profile state commissions in the 1930s, dams and housing projects and many schools and the Stockholm airport, working mainly in a rationalist style.  There's evidence for a penchant for square proportions for window and facade design.  The single most noticeable Modernist flourish is the brilliant cylindrical glass staircase for St. Erik's Gymnasium in Stockholm in 1939.  Later in his career Hedqvist took credit for some of the tallest buildings in Sweden.

He was awarded the Prince Eugen Medal for architecture in 1954.

Work 

 a portion of the housing exhibition at the Stockholm International Exhibition (1930)
 municipal baths in Eskilstuna, 1932
 terraced housing, in Ålstensgatan, Bromma, 1932
 the poured-concrete Uggleviksreservoaren ("Uggleviken Reservoir"), in the forest Lilljansskogen near Lake Uggleviken at Norra Djurgården in north-eastern central Stockholm, 1935
 Västerbron and Tranebergsbron bridges, 1935
 a portion of the Röda Bergen housing project in Vasastaden, Stockholm, circa 1936
 main terminal and other structures, Stockholm-Bromma Airport, 1936
 St. Erik's Gymnasium (School), Kungsholmen, 1939, with its distinctive glass-cylinder exterior staircase
 the cable-supported Hovet stadium, formerly known as Johanneshovs Isstadion, Stockholm, 1955
 Kockums Building, Malmö, Skåne län, circa 1955
 the Skatteskrapan ("Tax Scraper") office building, Stockholm, 1959, now converted into student apartments
 the 27-floor slender landmark Dagens Nyheter Building, Stockholm, 1964, tallest building in Sweden from 1964 to 2003
 Biomedical Centre, Uppsala University, Uppsala, circa 1968

Images

References

External links 
 photographs of Hedqvist's work
 Utopia & Reality, by Cecilia Widenheim, Eva Rudberg

1895 births
1977 deaths
Artists from Stockholm
Swedish architects
Swedish urban planners
Recipients of the Prince Eugen Medal
KTH Royal Institute of Technology alumni